Larry E. Frost (born December 15, 1940) is an American former politician. He served in the South Dakota House of Representatives from 2001 to 2006.

References

1940 births
Living people
People from Spink County, South Dakota
Businesspeople from South Dakota
Republican Party members of the South Dakota House of Representatives
Politicians from Aberdeen, South Dakota